

Leuthere (or Leutherius) was an Anglo-Saxon Bishop of Winchester.

Leuthere was consecrated in 670. He died before 676. Bede records that he attended the Council of Hertford in 672.

Citations

References

External links
 

Bishops of Winchester
7th-century English bishops

7th-century deaths
Year of birth unknown
Year of death unknown